The women's doubles competition at the 1994 Australian Open was held between 17 January and 30 January 1994 on outdoor hard courts at the National Tennis Centre at Flinders Park in Melbourne, Australia. Gigi Fernández and Natasha Zvereva won the title, defeating Patty Fendick and Meredith McGrath in the final.

Seeds

Draw

Finals

Top half

Section 1

Section 2

Bottom half

Section 3

Section 4

External links
 1994 Australian Open – Women's draws and results at the International Tennis Federation

Women's Doubles
Australian Open (tennis) by year – Women's doubles
1994 in Australian women's sport